Jenni Elina Haukio (born 7 April 1977) is a Finnish poet, political scientist and the spouse of the president of Finland since 1 March 2012. She is the second wife of the current president of Finland, Sauli Niinistö.

Career
Haukio graduated from the University of Turku with a master of political sciences degree in 2001. She completed her political science doctoral thesis on the digitisation of party campaigns at the University of Helsinki in 2022.

She worked at the University of Turku, first as a research assistant and then as a communications officer. From 2003 to 2005, she was a parliamentary assistant, and from 2005 to 2012 she worked for the National Coalition Party. Since February 2012, Haukio has been the programme manager for the Turku Book Fair.

Haukio has published three poetry collections. The first one won a national debut poet contest, Runo-Kaarina, in 1999.

Personal life
Haukio met Sauli Niinistö, then a widower, in 2005, while she was working for the National Coalition Party. Haukio interviewed Niinistö for the party's Nykypäivä magazine. They later became a couple, but they kept their relationship a secret from the public until their marriage on 3 January 2009. Their first child, a son named Aaro Veli Väinämö Niinistö, was born on 2 February 2018.

Honours

Finnish decorations
  :  Commander Grand Cross of the Order of the White Rose of Finland

Foreign decorations
  : Grand Cross of the Royal Norwegian Order of Merit (October 2012)
  : Commander Grand Cross of the Order of the Polar Star (April 2012)
  : Grand Cross of the Order of the Dannebrog (April 2013)
 : Grand Cross of the Order of National Merit (July 2013)
 : Commander Grand Cross of the Order of the Three Stars (October 2013)
  : First Class of the Order of the Cross of Terra Mariana (May 2014)
  : Grand Cross of the Order of Merit of the Republic of Poland (March 2015)
  : Grand Cross of the Order of Adolphe of Nassau (May 2016)
  : Recipient of the 70th Birthday Badge Medal of King Carl XVI Gustaf (30 April 2016)
 : Grand Cross of the Order of the Falcon (May 2018)
 : Grand Cross 1st class of the Order of Merit of the Federal Republic of Germany (September 2018)

References 

Living people
1977 births
First ladies and gentlemen of Finland
Finnish women poets
Recipients of the Order of the Cross of Terra Mariana, 1st Class
Grand Crosses of the Order of the Dannebrog
Grand Crosses of the Order of Merit of the Republic of Poland
Grand Crosses 1st class of the Order of Merit of the Federal Republic of Germany
People from Pori
University of Turku alumni